Ayabulela Konqobe Magqwaka (born 12 January 1996) is a South African football (soccer) midfielder who plays for Chippa United.

He hails from Gugulethu on the Cape Flats.

International career
He made his debut for South Africa national soccer team on 13 July 2021 in a 2021 COSAFA Cup game  against Lesotho. South Africa won the tournament.

References

External links
 Ayabulela Magqwaka at Footballdatabase
 

1996 births
Living people
Soccer players from Cape Town
South African soccer players
South African expatriate soccer players
Association football midfielders
Vasco da Gama (South Africa) players
Cape Town Spurs F.C. players
SuperSport United F.C. players
AmaZulu F.C. players
Thanda Royal Zulu F.C. players
Chippa United F.C. players
Steenberg United F.C. players
Ekenäs IF players
Ykkönen players
South African Premier Division players
National First Division players
South Africa international soccer players
South African expatriate sportspeople in Finland
Expatriate footballers in Finland
South Africa under-20 international soccer players